Depressaria discipunctella is a moth of the family Depressariidae. It is found in the Netherlands, Belgium, Germany, France, Spain, Portugal, Italy, Slovakia, Ukraine, Romania, Bulgaria, North Macedonia and Greece. Outside Europe it has been recorded from Lebanon, Syria and Iran. Formally found in Great Britain (last record in 1924 in Oxfordshire ), where it was previously widespread. 

The wingspan is 21–25 mm. Adults are on wing from May to June.

The larvae feed on Heracleum sphondylium, Pastinaca sativa, Angelica sylvestris and Ferula species. They feed from within spun-together flowers and seedsheads of their host plant.

References

External links
lepiforum.de

Moths described in 1854
Depressaria
Moths of Europe
Moths of Asia